Lanxi, alternately known as Lanchi and Lanki, is a county-level city under the administration of the prefecture-level city of Jinhua in west-central Zhejiang Province, east-central China.

The city executive, legislature and judiciary are at Lanjiang Subdistrict, together with the CPC and PSB branches. The town lies on the Lan River (Lanjiang), a tributary of the Fuchun River, both north-flowing; the Fuchun River empties into Hangzhou Bay.

Population history

Administration

Towns
 Huangdian
 Zhuge
 Majian
 Youbu
Notice that Lanjiang Zhen had been cancelled and changed into Lanjiang Jiedao.

Subdistricts
 Lanjiang
 Chixi
 Nyubu
Notice that some of the area of Nyubu had been accepted by Lanjiang Jiedao.
 Yunshan
 Yongchang
 Shanghua

Townships
 Shuiting She Ethnic Township

Famous Villages
 Zhuge Village

Climate

References

External links
 TRAVELZHEJIANG - The Official Travel Guide of Zhejiang Province

County-level cities in Zhejiang
Geography of Jinhua